Sara Cunial (born 8 July 1979) is an Italian politician, formerly of the Five Star Movement. She is leading the Vita electoral list into the 2022 Italian general election.

Political career 
Cunial was elected to the Chamber of Deputies in the 2018 general election. She was expelled from the party in 2019, and sat as an independent.
  
Cunial spoke in the Italian Parliament about Bill Gates and COVID-19.

See also 
 List of members of the Italian Chamber of Deputies, 2018–2022

References 

1979 births
Living people
University of Padua alumni
21st-century Italian politicians
21st-century Italian women politicians
Deputies of Legislature XVIII of Italy
Politicians affected by a party expulsion process
Five Star Movement politicians
Independent politicians in Italy
Women members of the Chamber of Deputies (Italy)